Elections for the London Borough of Merton were held on 2 May 2002. This was on the same day as other local elections in England. These elections were held under new ward boundaries, which increased the number of councillors to sixty from fifty-seven. Labour remained in overall control of the council with a reduced majority.

Results 
Between the last election and the polling day, an unusual number of seat changes had occurred. At a by-election in West Barnes on 9 November 2000, the Conservatives gained a seat from the Liberal Democrats. Of the 39 Labour councillors elected in 1998, one defected to the Green Party, three defected to independent Labour, one resigned from the party and one seat had become vacant in 2002. This meant that, on the eve of the election, Labour had 33 seats to the Conservatives' 13 and the Liberal Democrats had 2.

The Labour Party maintained its overall majority control in the borough, but its majority was reduced to four seats. The Conservatives made significant gains and indeed polled a higher vote share than Labour, despite winning fewer seats. The Liberal Democrats failed to hold onto the newly-redrawn ward of West Barnes, losing their three seats in the ward to the Conservatives.

The Merton Park Ward Residents' Association maintained its three councillors in Merton Park.

|}

Results by Ward

Abbey

Cannon Hill

Colliers Wood

Cricket Green

Dundonald

Figge's Marsh

Graveney

Hillside

Lavender Fields

Longthornton

Lower Morden

Merton Park

Pollards Hill

Ravensbury

Raynes Park

St Helier

Trinity

Village

West Barnes

Wimbledon Park

By-Elections

The by-election was called following the resignation of Cllr. Tony Giles.

The by-election was called following the resignation of Cllr. Leslie D. Mutch.

References

Council elections in the London Borough of Merton
2002 London Borough council elections
May 2002 events in the United Kingdom